The Greater South Shore Conference is a nine-member Indiana High School Athletic Association athletic conference spanning Lake and Porter counties in Northwest Indiana. Two other members, Boone Grove and South Central, participate only in football, otherwise participating in the Porter County Conference.

Hanover Central High School joined the conference in 2013, Griffith High School joined the conference in 2017, and Illiana Christian High School joined the conference in 2021. Marquette Catholic High School and North Newton High School left the conference concurrent with Griffith joining, with Marquette becoming an independent and North Newton joining the Midwest Conference.  The conference has two divisions for football, with the North Division including Boone Grove, Hammond Bishop Noll, Lake Station Edison, River Forest and South Central, and the South Division including Calumet, Griffith, Hanover Central, Wheeler and Whiting. Boone Grove and South Central are football-playing members only, competing in the Porter County Conference in all other sports. Illiana Christian does not have a football team.

Due to continued rapid growth, Hanover Central has announced it will leave the conference in 2023 to join the Northwest Crossroads Conference. The conference has announced that Gary West Side will join as a football-only member upon Hanover Central's departure.

Membership 

 Boone Grove and South Central (UM) are football-only members. They compete in the Porter County Conference in other sports.

Former Members

 Marquette does not play football.

Football Divisions

Conference Championships

Football 

 N- North Division, S-  South Division.

Boys Basketball

Girls Basketball

State Champions

Bishop Noll Warriors (6)
 1968 Baseball
 1981 Boys Swimming & Diving
 1984 Boys Swimming & Diving
 1989 Football (3A)
 2004 Baseball (2A)
 2018 Soccer (2A)

Marquette Catholic Blazers (9)
 1999 Volleyball (A)
 2000 Volleyball (A)
 2001 Volleyball (A)
 2004 Volleyball (A)
 2005 Volleyball (A)
 2006 Volleyball (A)
 2007 Volleyball (A)
 2008 Volleyball (A)
 2014 Boys Basketball (A)

Wheeler High School (2)
 2010 Boys Basketball (2A)
 2010 Softball (2A)

Calumet Warriors (1)
 1965 Boys Cross-Country

Illiana Christian Vikings (1)
 2022 Baseball (2A)

Resources 
 IHSAA Conferences
 IHSAA Directory
 IHSAA State Champions
 IHSAA Classification
 IHSAA Football Classification

References

Indiana high school athletic conferences
High school sports conferences and leagues in the United States